Khabarovsk is the largest city and the administrative centre of Khabarovsk Krai, Russia, located  from the China–Russia border, at the confluence of the Amur and Ussuri Rivers, about  north of Vladivostok. With a 2010 population of 577,441, it is Russia's easternmost city. The city was the administrative center of the Far Eastern Federal District of Russia from 2002 until December 2018, when Vladivostok took over that role. It is the largest city in the Russian Far East, having overtaken Vladivostok in 2015. It was known as Khabarovka until 1893. As is typical of the interior of the Russian Far East, Khabarovsk has an extreme climate with very strong seasonal swings resulting in strong cold winters and relatively hot and humid summers.

History

Earliest record
Historical records indicate that a city was founded on the site in the eighth century. The Tungusic peoples are indigenous to the city's vicinity. The city was named  in Chinese when it was part of the Chinese empire. During the Tang dynasty, Boli was the capital of Heishui Protectorate, called Heishui Duhufu.
 In A.D. 722, Emperor Xuanzong of Tang (唐玄宗) established Heishui Protectorate and gave self-rule to Heishui Mohe tribes. The seat of this administrative region was then established near today's Khabarovsk.

17th-century Russian exploration
In the mid-17th century, the Amur Valley became the scene of hostilities between the Russian Cossacks, who tried to expand into the region and collect tribute from the natives, and the rising Manchu Qing dynasty, who were intent on securing the region for themselves.

Khabarov's Achansk

The Russian explorers and raiders of the 1650s set up a number of more or less fortified camps (ostrogs) on the Amur. Most of them were in use for only a few months and later destroyed. It is usually thought that the first such camp in the general area of today's Khabarovsk was the fortified winter camp named Achansk or Achansky gorodok, built by the Cossacks of Yerofey Khabarov in September 1651 after they had sailed to the area from the upper Amur. The fort was named after the local tribe whom Khabarov's people called "Achans". On October 8 the fort was unsuccessfully attacked by joint forces of Achans and Duchers (who had good reasons to hate the Cossacks, due to their rather heavy-handed tribute-extraction tactics), while many Russians were away fishing. In late November, Khabarov's people undertook a three-day campaign against the local chief Zhakshur (Жакшур) (whose name is also known in a more Russian version, Zaksor (Заксор)), collecting a large amount of tribute and announcing that the locals were now subjects of the Russian Czar. A similar campaign was waged later in winter against the Ducher chief Nechiga (Нечига), farther away from Achansk.

On March 24 (or 26), 1652, Fort Achansk was attacked by Manchu cavalry, led by Ninguta's commander Haise, reinforced by Ducher auxiliaries, but the Cossacks stood their ground in a day-long battle and even managed to seize the attackers' supply train. Once the ice on the Amur broke in the spring of 1652, Khabarov's people destroyed their fort and sailed away.

The exact location of Khabarov's Achansk has long been a subject for debate among Russian historians and geographers. A number of locations, both upstream and downstream of today's Khabarovsk, have been proposed since Richard Maack, one of the first Russian scholars to visit the region, identified Achansk in 1859 with the ruins on Cape Kyrma, which is located on the southern (Chinese) shore of the Amur, upstream of Khabarovsk. The most widely accepted point of view is probably that of Boris Polevoy, who believed that Khabarov's Achansk was located in the Nanai village later known as Odzhal-Bolon, located on the left bank of the Amur, closer to Amursk than to Khabarovsk. One of his arguments was that both Khabarov's Achan (sometimes also spelt by the explorer as Otshchan, Отщан), and Wuzhala (乌扎拉) of the Chinese records of the 1652 engagement are based on the name of the Nanai clan "Odzhal" (Оджал), corresponding to the 20th-century name of the village as well. (The name of the clan was also written as "Uzala", as in the name of its best-known member, Dersu Uzala).

Polevoy's view appeared to gain wide support among the Russian geographer community; petitioned by the Amur Branch of the Russian Geographical Society, the Russian Government renamed the village of Odzhal to Achan in 1977, to celebrate its connection with Khabarov's raid.

As to the Cape Kyrma ruins, thought by Maack to be the remains of Achansk, B.P. Polevoy identified them as the remains of another ostrog – namely, Kosogorsky Ostrog, where Onufriy Stepanov stayed a few years later.

Qing Empire
After the Treaty of Nerchinsk (1689) between the Tsardom of Russia and the  Qing Empire, the area became an uncontested part of China for the next century and a half. Modern historical maps of the Qing period published in China mark the site of future Khabarovsk as Bólì. All of the middle and lower Amur region was nominally part of the Jilin Province, run first out of Ninguta and later out of Jilin City.

French Jesuits who sailed along the Ussuri and the Amur Rivers in 1709 prepared the first more or less precise map of the region. According to them, the indigenous Nanai people were living on the Ussuri and on the Amur down to the mouth of the Dondon River (i.e., in the region including the site of the future Khabarovsk). These people were known to the Chinese as Yupi Dazi ("Fish skin Tartars").

From Khabarovka to Khabarovsk

In 1858, the area was ceded to Russia under the Treaty of Aigun. The Russians founded the military outpost of Khabarovka, named after Yerofey Khabarov. The post later became an important industrial center for the region. Town status was granted in 1880. In 1893, it was given its present name: Khabarovsk.

In 1894, a department of the Russian Geographical Society was formed in Khabarovsk and to found libraries, theatres and museums in the city. Since then, Khabarovsk's cultural life has flourished. Much of the local indigenous history has been well preserved in the Regional Lore Museum and Natural History Museum and in places like near the Nanai settlement of Sikachi-Alyan, where cliff drawings from more than 13,000 years ago can be found. The Khabarovsk Art Museum exhibits a rare collection of old Russian icons.

In 1916, the Khabarovsk Bridge across the Amur was completed, allowing Trans-Siberian trains to cross the river without using ferries (or temporary rail tracks over the frozen river in winter). During the Russian Civil War, Khabarovsk was occupied by Japan in September 1918.

Soviet era

After the defeat of Japan in World War II,  Khabarovsk was the site of the Khabarovsk War Crime Trials, in which twelve former members of the Japanese Kwantung Army and Unit 731 were put on trial for the manufacture and use of biological weapons during World War II.

Chinese Emperor Puyi, captured by Soviet troops in Manchuria, was relocated to Khabarovsk and lived there from 1945 up to 1950, when he was returned to China.

When Japan fell in September 1945 the United States reached an agreement with Stalin to build two U.S. Naval Advance Bases (Fleet Weather Centrals) in the USSR. The U.S. built one  outside Petropavlovsk-Kamchatsky on the Kamchatka Peninsula with the code name TAMA.  The other was  outside Khabarovsk in buildings provided by the Soviets, code-named MOKO.  For mail Khabarovsk was assigned  U.S.Navy number 1168,  FPO San Francisco.  The American use of these two bases was short-lived.

On 5 November 1956, the first phase of the city tram was commissioned. The Khabarovsk television studio began broadcasting in 1960. On 1 September 1967, the Khabarovsk Institute of Physical Education, now the Far Eastern State Academy of Physical Culture, opened. On 14 January 1971 Khabarovsk was awarded the Order of October Revolution. In 1975 the first stage of the urban trolley opened. In 1976 the city hosted an international ice hockey tournament with the ball for the prize of the newspaper Sovietskaya Rossia. In 1981 the Bandy World Championship was played in the city.

Russian Federation
In 1996, Khabarovsk held its first mayoral elections. Paul D. Filippov, whose candidacy was supported by Governor Viktor Ishayev, was defeated. In 1998, reconstruction of the central square of Khabarovsk was completed. In May 2000, President of Russia, Vladimir Putin, decreed that new federal districts be formed, and Khabarovsk became the center of the Far Eastern Federal District.

In 2006, the Center for Cardiovascular Surgery, a high-tech medical center, was constructed according to a Russian national health project. In 2008, the train station was completely renovated, and the adjacent square was reconstructed to include fountains and an underground passage. In 2009, Khabarovsk hosted the EU-Russia summit. In 2010, the city hosted a meeting of the Great Circle of Ussuri Cossacks. On 3 November 2012, Khabarovsk was awarded the honorary title of "City of Military Glory".

On 9 July 2020, the governor of the region, Sergei Furgal, was arrested and flown to Moscow. The 2020 Khabarovsk Krai protests began on 11 July 2020 in support of Furgal.

Flag

The flag of Khabarovsk displays a bear and a Siberian tiger holding a yellow shield with a blue reversed pall and a red fish. The flag is a representation of the coat of arms of Khabarovsk. The flag was adopted on 30 October 2007 and is 2:3 in ratio.

Climate

Khabarovsk experiences a monsoonal dry-winter humid continental climate (Köppen climate classification Dwb borders on Dwa).

In a few years, November to March hardly receive any precipitation. The driest year was 2001 with only  of precipitation and the wettest was 1981 when  of precipitation fell.

Administrative and municipal status
Khabarovsk is the administrative center of the krai and, within the framework of administrative divisions, it also serves as the administrative center of Khabarovsky District, even though it is not a part of it. As an administrative division, it is incorporated separately as the city of krai significance of Khabarovsk—an administrative unit with the status equal to that of the districts. As a municipal division, the city of krai significance of Khabarovsk is incorporated as Khabarovsk Urban Okrug.

Demographics
Ethnic composition (2010):
 Russians – 92.6%
 Ukrainians – 1.8%
 Koreans – 1.1%
 Chinese – 0.6%
 Tatars – 0.5%
 Uzbeks – 0.5%
 Others – 2.9%

Economy and infrastructure

Primary industries include iron processing, steel milling, Khabarovsk shipyard, Daldizel, machinery, petroleum refining, flour milling, pharmaceutical industry, meatpacking and manufacturing of various types of heavy and light machinery.

A high-speed international fiber-optic cable connects the city of Khabarovsk with the city of Fuyuan in China.

Transportation

Khabarovsk is served by the Khabarovsk Novy Airport with international flights to East Asia, Southeast Asia, European Russia, and Central Asia.

Road links include the Trans-Siberian Highway (M58 and M60 Highways), and water transport links are provided by the Amur River and Ussuri River.

Public transport includes: tram (8 routes); trolleybus (4 routes); bus and fixed-route taxi (marshrutka, approximately 100 routes).

Transborder travel to China in winter ice road in summer boat on Amur river to Fuyuan (and train to Harbin)

Education
There are the following institutions of higher education in Khabarovsk:
Pacific National University (former Khabarovsk State University of Technology)
Far Eastern State University of Humanities (former Khabarovsk State Teachers Training University)
Far Eastern State Medical University
Khabarovsk State Academy of Economics and Law
Far Eastern State Transport University
Far Eastern Academy of Public Service
Far Eastern State Physical Education University
Khabarovsk State Institute of Arts and Culture

Tourism

A key street in Khabarovsk is the broad Amursky Boulevard with its many shops and a local market. The city's five districts stretch for  along the Amur River. The similar boulevard – Ussuryisky is located between the two main streets Muravyov-Amursky and Lenin street and runs to the city's artificial lakes (Gorodskie Prudi) with the sport complex Platinum Arena. The lakes are famous for their fountains with the light show. The Military History Museum of the Far Eastern Military District is located in the city, the only such museum in the Russian Far East.

Recently, there have been renovations in the city's central part, rebuilding with historical perspective. There is a walking tour from the Lenin Square to Utyos on Amur via Muravyov-Amursky Street, where visitors find traditional Russian cuisine restaurants and shops with souvenirs. There are a number of night clubs and pubs in this area.
In Wintertime ice sculptures are on display on the cities squares and parks. Artists come from as far as Harbin in China.

Unlike Vladivostok, the city has never been closed to foreigners, despite it being the headquarters of the Far East Military District, and retains its historically international flavor. Once the capital of the Soviet Far East (from 1926 to 1938), since the demise of the Soviet Union, it has experienced an increased Asian presence. It is estimated that over one million Chinese travel to and through Khabarovsk yearly, and foreign investment by Japanese and Korean corporations have grown in recent years. The city has a multi-story shopping mall and about a dozen hotels.

Aleksandr Fedosov, the Khabarovsk Krai Minister of Culture, estimates that the city became more attractive to tourists following the 2015 Bandy World Championship.

Khabarovsk is the closest major city to Birobidzhan, which is the administrative center of the Jewish Autonomous Oblast, Russia, located on the Trans-Siberian Railway, close to the border with China. The Jewish Autonomous Oblast is a federal subject of Russia in the Russian Far East, bordering Khabarovsk Krai and Amur Oblast in Russia and Heilongjiang province in China. Its administrative center is the town of Birobidzhan, and it is the only region in the world in which Yiddish is the official language. Khabarovsk provides the closest major airport to Birobidzhan, which is Khabarovsk Novy Airport (KHV / UHHH), 198 km from the center of Birobidzhan.

Military

The headquarters of the Russian Ground Forces's Eastern Military District is located at 15 Serysheva Street. The district was preceded by the Far Eastern Military District, which was located in the same location. The following component units of the district are stationed in the city:

 104th Chuj Headquarters Brigade 
 Honour Guard Company of the Khabarovsk Garrison
 17th Independent Electronic Warfare Brigade 
 118th Independent Pontoon-Bridge Railway Battalion
 392nd Pacific Training Center for Junior Specialists 
 11th Air and Air Defence Forces Army
 Military Band of the Eastern Military District

All 5 of these units make up the Khabarovsk Garrison. The Russian Navy's Pacific Fleet maintains a presence in the city as well. The main public relations asset for the military in the city is the Military History Museum of the Far Eastern Military District and the district military band.

Sports

Amur Khabarovsk, a professional ice hockey club of the international Kontinental Hockey League and plays its home games at the Platinum Arena. It used to be the furthest team from the European-based teams in the league until Admiral Vladivostok joined the KHL in 2013 as an expansion team.
FC SKA-Khabarovsk, a professional association football team playing in the Russian First League, the second tier of Russian association football.
SKA-Neftyanik, a professional bandy club which plays in the top-tier Russian Bandy Super League at its own indoor venue Arena Yerofey. It is both the easternmost and southernmost team in the top division. In the 2016–17 season the club became Russian champion for the first time. As of 2019 the team has won the title three years in a row.

International events
The city was a host to the 1981 Bandy World Championship.  It also hosted the 2015 Bandy World Championship, which was visited by Prime Minister Dmitry Medvedev. 21 teams were expected, which would have been 4 more than the then record-making 17 (now it's 18) from the 2014 tournament. In the end, China was the only newcomer, while Canada and Ukraine withdrew, the latter for political reasons. Khabarovsk organised the 2018 tournament as well, but not Division B that time around, which was held in Chinese Harbin. The event was named by the Federal Agency for Tourism as one of the best 200 events of the year.

A delegation from the 2022 Winter Olympics organising committee will visit Khabarovsk to watch matches in the bandy league since they are considering letting bandy be a part of the programme in 2022.

Notable people

Twin towns – sister cities

Khabarovsk is twinned with:
 Niigata, Japan (1965)
 Portland, United States (1988)
 Victoria, Canada (1990) As of March 4, 2022, Victoria City Council voted to suspend the city's relationship with Khabarovsk as a result of the 2022 Russian invasion of Ukraine.
 Harbin, China (1993)
 Bucheon, South Korea (2002)
 Sanya, China (2011)

Awards
Khabarovsk placed first in different categories of "Most Developed and Comfortable City of Russia" in 2006, 2008 and 2009.
In 2010, Khabarovsk won the second place in the Forbes list of most suitable cities for private business in Russia. First place went to Krasnodar.

See also

Bolshoy Ussuriysky Island
2020 Khabarovsk Krai protests

References

Notes

Sources

Nikolay P. Kradin. It Is Protected by the State: the Monuments of Architecture in Khabarovsk. Khabarovsk: Chastnaya kollektsiya, 1999. 192 p.

External links

 Official website of Khabarovsk
 Khabarovsk Business Directory  
 Manchu-Korean expedition against Russian expansion (나선정벌 (羅禪征伐)
 map of the Manchu-Korean expedition against Russian expansion (나선정벌 (羅禪征伐)
 Major problems of Russian-Korean relationship
 China and Russia relationship and history 
 Website of Khabarovsk

 
1858 establishments in the Russian Empire
Geography of Northeast Asia
Russian Far East